The 1986 European Taekwondo Championships were held in Seefeld, Austria. The event took place from 3 to 5 October, 1986.

Medal summary

Men

Women

References

External links 
 European Taekwondo Union

1986 in taekwondo
European Taekwondo Championships
International sports competitions hosted by Austria
1986 in European sport
1986 in Austrian sport